Nicholas Anthony Prisco (January 12, 1909 – June 13, 1981) was an American football tailback who played one season with the Philadelphia Eagles of the National Football League (NFL). He was born in Edgewater, New Jersey and attended Leonia High School in Leonia, New Jersey before playing college football at Rutgers University. His surname has also been spelled as "Priscoe".

College career
Prisco played for the Rutgers Scarlet Knights. He won the George T. Cronin Trophy his senior year in 1932.

Professional career
Prisco played in two games for the NFL's Philadelphia Eagles in 1933.

Coaching career
Prisco became head football coach of the Woodbridge High School Barrons of Woodbridge Township, New Jersey in 1935. He won the state championship in 1938, 1939 and 1960. He was also a physical education teacher and baseball coach at Woodbridge. The school's football field was later renamed "Nicholas Priscoe Field".

References

External links
 Just Sports Stats

1909 births
1981 deaths
20th-century American educators
American football running backs
Rutgers Scarlet Knights football players
Philadelphia Eagles players
High school baseball coaches in the United States
High school football coaches in New Jersey
Leonia High School alumni
People from Edgewater, New Jersey
Sportspeople from Bergen County, New Jersey
Players of American football from New Jersey
Schoolteachers from  New Jersey